The Chelsea Murders (known in the USA as Murder Games) is a thriller by Lionel Davidson published in 1978.  The book won the Crime Writers' Association's Gold Dagger Award.

Plot summary

Someone is killing residents of the hip bohemian London neighborhood of Chelsea, home to literary giants of the past like Virginia Woolf.  What thread connects them in someone's mad mind?   The only clue is a fragment of film, which accidentally caught images of the murderer, dressed in an outlandish costume and mask.

Television adaptation
An adaptation of the novel was broadcast in 1981, directed by Derek Bennett as a Television film and was released on DVD in March 2010.

References

The TV series was re- shown on Talking Pictures Channel on 01/07/2021            (3 episodes).

1978 British novels
British thriller novels
Novels set in London
Jonathan Cape books
British novels adapted into films